This is a list of all neighborhoods in the section of Harlem, in the New York City borough of Manhattan.

Central Harlem
Astor Row
Strivers' Row
Le Petit Senegal

East Harlem
Spanish Harlem

West Harlem
Hamilton Heights
Manhattanville
Morningside Heights
Sugar Hill, Manhattan

Harlem
Lists of neighborhoods in U.S. cities